Smith's Expedition to Tupelo was a military movement of the Union Army during the American Civil War.

The Expedition
On July 5, 1864 Major General Andrew Jackson Smith of the XVI Corps set out on an expedition to protect Major General William T. Sherman’s supply line of his Atlanta campaign. Against Major General Stephen D. Lee and Major General Nathan Bedford Forrest after the Confederate victory at the Battle of Brice's Crossroads, the supply lines for Major General William T. Sherman's armies in Georgia became increasingly vulnerable the expedition ended on July 21, 1864.

Result
The expedition was a Union success with the Battle of Tupelo however the Federal troops began a retreat back to Memphis within a few days due to spoiled rations.

Union Army
Right Wing-XVI Corps - Major General Andrew J. Smith
1st Division - Brigadier General Joseph A. Mower
1st Brigade - Colonel William L. McMillen
2nd Brigade - Colonel Alexander Wilkin (k)
3rd Brigade - Colonel Joseph J. Woods
4th Brigade - Colonel Lyman M. Ward (detached from XVII Corps)
2nd Division - Colonel David Moore
1st Brigade - Colonel Charles D. Murray
2nd Brigade - Colonel James I. Gilbert
3rd Brigade - Colonel Edward H. Wolfe (detached from 4th Division)
Cavalry Division - Brigadier General Benjamin H. Grierson
2nd Brigade - Colonel Edward F. Winslow
3rd Brigade - Colonel Datus E. Coon
U.S.C.T.
1st Brigade - Colonel Edward Bouton

References

Union Army
1864 in Mississippi